Saskhori is a small settlement in Nichbisistskali Gorge in Municipality of Mtskheta in Georgia. The area is part of the traditional region of Ertso-Tianeti.

History
Saskhori is mentioned in 1441 in the deed "Deed on the sacrifice of Saskhori of King Alexander to Svetitskhoveli". Village is also mentioned in the document of 1467 I.21. - The Book of Mercy of the land to Daniel Eliozisdze from King Bagrat". Saskhori is mentioned as a village in the description of Ioane Bagrationi in 1794–1799. According to the Iveria newspaper of May 18, 1886, Ilia, Niko, and Luarsab Merab Gedevanovs (Gedevanishvilis) were pledged to the Tbilisi Noble-Local Bank in the Tbilisi Province and Gori Mazra; Land sold by the bank for non-payment of taxes.

Population
In 2014, the population was 332.

The village is mainly inhabited by surnames: Gochiashvili, Iremashvili, Kituashvili, Lomouri, Kavtiashvili, Kvarkhishvili, Merebashvili, Papiashvili, Khizanishvili, Kartvelishvili, Shavshishvili, Khizanashvili, Javakhishvili and Jalabadze.

Historical places
Three historic churches are found in Saskhori: Church of Mary, mother of Jesus, Church of St. George and Church of Archangel. An old castle was used in wars for defense.

References

External links
 saskhori.wordpress.com
Saskhori at Wikimapia
Saskhori
 Census population 2014

Populated places in Mtskheta Municipality